Sergei Prokofiev set to work on his Piano Concerto No. 2 in G minor, Op. 16, in 1912 and completed it the next year. But that version of the concerto is lost; the score was destroyed in a fire following the Russian Revolution. Prokofiev reconstructed the work in 1923, two years after finishing his Piano Concerto No. 3, and declared it to be "so completely rewritten that it might almost be considered [Piano Concerto] No. 4." Indeed its orchestration has features that clearly postdate the 1921 concerto. Performing as soloist, Prokofiev premiered this "No. 2" in Paris on 8 May 1924 with Serge Koussevitzky conducting. It is dedicated to the memory of Maximilian Schmidthof, a friend of Prokofiev's at the Saint Petersburg Conservatory who had killed himself in 1913.

Movements and scoring
The work is scored for piano solo, 2 flutes, 2 oboes, 2 clarinets, 2 bassoons, 4 horns, 2 trumpets, 3 trombones, tuba, timpani, bass drum, snare drum, cymbals, tambourine and strings. It consists of four movements lasting some 29 to 37 minutes.

Andantino—Allegretto (10–12 minutes)
Scherzo: Vivace (2–3 minutes)
Intermezzo: Allegro moderato (6–8 minutes)
Finale: Allegro tempestoso (10–11 minutes)

Premiere and reception
The work is dedicated to the memory of Maximilian Schmidthof, a friend of Prokofiev's at the St. Petersburg Conservatory, who had committed suicide in April 1913 after having written a farewell letter to Prokofiev. Prokofiev premiered the work that same year, performing the solo piano part, on August 23 at Pavlovsk. Most of the audience reacted intensely. The concerto's wild temperament left a positive impression on some of the listeners, whereas others were opposed to the jarring and modernistic sound ("To hell with this futurist music!" "What is he doing, making fun of us?" "The cats on the roof make better music!").

When the original orchestral score was destroyed in a fire following the Russian Revolution, Prokofiev reconstructed and considerably revised the concerto in 1923; in the process, he made the concerto, in his own words, "less foursquare" and "slightly more complex in its contrapuntal fabric". The finished result, Prokofiev felt, was "so completely rewritten that it might almost be considered [Concerto] No. 4". (Piano Concerto No. 3 had premiered in 1921). He premiered this revised version of the concerto in Paris on May 8, 1924 with Serge Koussevitzky conducting.

It remains one of the most technically formidable piano concertos in the standard repertoire. Prokofiev biographer David Nice noted in 2011: "A decade ago I’d have bet you there were only a dozen pianists in the world who could play Prokofiev’s Second Piano Concerto properly. Argerich wouldn’t touch it, Kissin delayed learning it, and even Prokofiev as virtuoso had got into a terrible mess trying to perform it with Ansermet and the BBC Symphony Orchestra in the 1930s, when it had gone out of his fingers."

Analysis

The first and last movements are each around twelve minutes long and constitute some of the most dramatic music in all of Prokofiev's piano concertos. They both contain long and developed cadenzas with the first movement's cadenza alone taking up almost the entire last half of the movement.

Andantino—Allegretto
The first movement opens quietly with strings and clarinet playing a two-bar staccato theme which, Prokofiev biographer Daniel Jaffé suggests, "sounds almost like a ground bass passacaglia theme, that musical symbol of implacable fate". The piano takes over, constructing over a left hand accompaniment of breathing undulation a G minor narrante theme which, in the words of Soviet biographer Israel Nestyev, "suggests a quiet, serious tale in the vein of a romantic legend". This opening theme contains a second idea, a rising scalic theme; as Robert Layton observes, when it is later taken up by unison strings as "a broad singing melody, one feels that the example of Rachmaninov has not gone altogether unheeded".

A brief forte, backed by the orchestra, leads to a third, expansive, walking theme performed again by the solo pianist; Layton notes that this "looks forward to its counterpart in the Third Piano Concerto: there is no mistaking its slightly flippant character". The recapitulation section is in effect carried entirely by the soloist's notoriously taxing five-minute cadenza, one of the longer and more difficult cadenze in the classical piano repertoire, taking the listener all the way to the movement's climax. Noted in two staves, the piano plays a reprise of its own opening theme. A third staff, which requires the pianist to perform large jumps with both hands frequently, contains the motif from the earlier orchestral accompaniment.

The accumulated charge is eventually released in a premature climax (G minor), marked  and colossale, which consists of oscillating triplet semiquaver runs across the upper four octaves of the piano, kept in rhythm by a leaping left-hand crotchet accompaniment. Prokofiev himself describes this as one of the hardest places in the concerto.

The last bars before the absolute climax are marked tumultuoso and reach supreme discord as C sharp minor collides with D minor.

The listener is exposed to the apocalyptic blare of several horns, trombones, trumpets and tuba, which, as Jaffé describes it, "balefully [play] the opening 'fate' theme fortissimo", while piano, flutes and strings still shriek in unison up and down the higher ranges. Two cymbal crashes end the cataclysm in G minor.

A decrescendo brings the music back to an almost spooky piano in which the piano timidly puts forth the second narrante theme, echoes its last notes, repeats it pianissimo, ever fading. Pizzicato strings point several more times to the opening theme, the significance of which has now been revealed.

Scherzo: Vivace
The scherzo is of an exceptionally strict form considering the piano part. The right and left hand play a stubborn unison, almost 1500 semiquavers each, literally without a moment's pause: Robert Layton describes the soloist in this movement being like "some virtuoso footballer who retains the initiative while the opposing team (the orchestra) all charge after him". At around ten notes a second and with hardly any variations in speed, this movement lasts circa two-and-a-half minutes and is an unusual concentration challenge to the pianist. It displays the motor line of the five "lines" (characters) Prokofiev describes in his own music. (Other such pieces include Toccata in D minor and the last movement of Piano Sonata No. 7.) One fleeting motif, to make a major appearance in the final movement, appears (fig. 39 in the score) in the cellos' part – "a chromatically inflected triplet plus quaver, played twice before tailing off". Unlike the other three movements, it is mainly in D minor.

Intermezzo: Allegro moderato
Instead of a lyrical slow movement which might have been expected after a scherzo (cf Brahms's Second Piano Concerto), Prokofiev provides a fast-paced, menacing Intermezzo. Layton characterises this movement as "in some ways the most highly characterized of all four movements, with its flashes of sardonic wit and forward-looking harmonies".

The movement starts with a heavy-footed walking bass theme – directed to be played heavily (pesante) and fortissimo. The music has returned to G minor. Strings, bassoon, tuba, timpani and gran cassa (bass drum) march along with moody determination. Trombones sharply pronounce a D, followed by tuba and oboe in a sudden diminuendo. For several bars, the orchestra issues ever waning threats, at the same time making inexorably for the tonic, at which point the piano enters and the music immediately gains force. The march of the introduction continues as the piano modulates into new harmonic territory. There is one moment of respite from this "sarcastically grotesque procession" with the single appearance of "an introverted theme of numbed lyricism". After a restatement of the earlier material, the music ventures into a new lyrical theme in D minor, marked  and dolce, un poco scherzando. The piano and flutes gracefully glide up and down the upper octaves. Then, the piano repeats the theme by itself, humorous and secco, before being joined by the orchestra. The tension builds and the music ascends until it reaches a climax, when the opening theme returns with baleful trombones and crashing chords at the top of the piano. The woodwinds bring the intensity back down and the movement ends quietly with a final stroke of wit.

Finale: Allegro tempestoso
Five octaves above the intermezzo's end note, a fortissimo tirade pounces out of the sky, written in  but with a repeating pattern seven quavers long (accented as ). After six bars it settles down in the vicinity of middle C. Running up to an acid semitonal acciaccatura in both hands, the piano goes over into a sprint of octave-chords and single notes, jumping manically up and down the keyboard twice a bar. An audible theme is picked out, and during a piano and staccato repetition of the theme, the strings and flutes rush up, bringing the music to the briefest of halts. A moment later the piano goes back to forte and the sprint sets off anew. It is repeated three more times in total before the piano performs a stormy gallop of triads (tempestoso), the hands flying apart more or less symmetrically, while the strings throw in a frantic accompaniment of regular staccato eighths. The piano puts a momentary end to its own fury with a barely feasible manoeuvre, both hands jumping up three or four octaves simultaneously and fortissimo in the time of a semiquaver. But by then the sprint has transformed into a "fearful pursuit with an obsessively repeated triplet motif [first heard fleetingly in the Scherzo movement] overshadowed by the baleful roars of tuba and trombones". Only moments later, the orchestra has reached a halt and the piano, unaccompanied, plays soft but dissonant chords which, Jaffé suggests, are "reminiscent of the bell-like chords which open the final piece in Schoenberg's Six Little Piano Pieces, Op. 19" which were composed in homage to Mahler shortly after his death. (Jaffé points out that Prokofiev had introduced Schoenberg's music to Russia by playing the Op. 11 pieces, and suggests that Prokofiev may have known and been inspired by Schoenberg's Op. 19 to use a similar bell motif to commemorate Schmidthof.)

The piano stands aside for eight bars while the strings, still , embark on a new episode. The soloist then plays a wistful theme in D minor similar in character to the first movement's piano opening theme, characterised by Jaffé as a "lullaby" while noting (as does Nestyev) its affinity to Mussorgsky. The bassoons take up the wandering piano-theme, while the piano itself goes over into a  semiquaver accompaniment. The music eventually winds down, with "a despondent-sounding version of the lullaby theme on bassoon abruptly cut off by a sharply articulated and very final sounding cadence from the orchestra". But, as Jaffé notes, "The pianist won't let things rest... but hammers out the 'pursuit' theme", so initiating "not so much a cadenza... but a post-cadential meditation on the 'bell' chords". The orchestra joins in after some time, reintroducing the piano's "lullaby" theme, while the soloist's part still flows across the octaves. The key regularly changes from A minor to C minor and back again, the music becomes ever broader and harder to play. Rhythm and tune then fall into an abrupt piano, no less threatening than the previous forte. Trundling chromaticism has the music roll up to a fortissimo, the orchestra still proclaiming the originally wistful piano-theme. This is the only place outside the andantino where the piano exceeds the older range of seven octaves, jumping two octaves up to B7 just one single time.

Then a ferocious blast from the orchestra starts off the ferocious reprise.

Recordings
The first recording of the concerto was made in November 1953 and released the next year on Remington Records: R-199-182. The pianist was Jorge Bolet, the Cincinnati Symphony Orchestra was led by Thor Johnson, and Laszlo Halasz and Don Gabor supervised. Bolet's performance set a standard by which several later recordings were judged: Shura Cherkassky and Herbert Menges (HMV mono); Nicole Henriot and Charles Munch (with a bad cut in the first movement; RCA stereo); and Malcolm Frager and René Leibowitz (also RCA stereo). Tedd Joselson, then 19 years old, launched his recording career with this work in a 1973 partnership with the Philadelphia Orchestra and conductor Eugene Ormandy (again on RCA).

List

Recommendations 
The Prokofiev Page, a website by Sugi Sorensen, recommended the recording by Gutiérrez with Järvi and the Royal Concertgebouw Orchestra; this received more acclaim when reissued in 2009. More recently the Grammy-winning recording by Kissin, with Ashkenazy now conducting the Philharmonia Orchestra, has received praise, as has that by Wang and Dudamel.

Film
The concerto's scherzo provides the musical score for Swiss animator Georges Schwizgebel's animated short, Jeu.

Notes

References

External links
 
 The Prokofiev Page (including Catalog of Prokofiev works)
 Online version of Liner Notes from Recording on Naxos
 , Yuja Wang, Berlin Philharmonic, Paavo Järvi, 2015

Piano concertos by Sergei Prokofiev
1913 compositions
Compositions in G minor
Music dedicated to family or friends